Ambalakida is a  rural municipality in Madagascar. It belongs to the district of Mahajanga II, which is a part of Boeny Region. The population of the commune was estimated to be approximately 5,000 in 2001 commune census.

Industry
There is a sugar cane mill in Antanamifafy, a village that belongs to this municipality.

References and notes 

Populated places in Boeny